Matt Hanna (born January 29, 1979) is an American lacrosse player who played for the Denver Outlaws of Major League Lacrosse. Hanna served as captain of the 2002 Johns Hopkins University lacrosse program in Baltimore, Maryland. Hanna was selected as an MLL All-Star in 2008, and retired at the end of the '08 season. Matt Hanna is the founder and director of Next One Up, an inner city mentoring program for at-risk student-athletes in Baltimore City. He is also the head lacrosse coach at Cristo Rey Jesuit High School in Baltimore.

MLL

References

Living people
1979 births
Johns Hopkins Blue Jays men's lacrosse players
American lacrosse players
Major League Lacrosse players